The Warsangli linnet (Linaria johannis) is a species of finch in the family Fringillidae. It is found only in Warsangeli Territory of Somalia. Its natural habitats are subtropical or tropical dry forest and subtropical or tropical high-altitude shrubland. It is threatened by habitat loss.

The Warsangli linnet was formerly placed in the genus Carduelis but was assigned to the genus Linaria based on a phylogenetic analysis of mitochondrial and nuclear DNA sequences.

References

Warsangli linnet
Endemic birds of Somalia
Warsangli linnet
Warsangli linnet
Taxonomy articles created by Polbot
Somali montane xeric woodlands